House of the Damned may refer to:

 House of the Damned (1963 film), an American horror film
 House of the Damned (1974 film), a Spanish film starring Carmen Sevilla
 House of the Damned (1996 film), an American zombie horror comedy film
 House of the Damned, alternate title for Don't Look in the Attic, an Italian horror film
 House of the Damned, alternate title for Spectre (1996 film), an American-Irish horror film
 House of the Damned (1999 film), a film starring Chapman To